Raffaele Illiano (born February 11, 1977 in Naples) is an Italian professional road racing cyclist.

Palmares

 2003
 1st, Giro del Lago Maggiore
 Tour du Sénégal, 2 stages
2004
 1st, GP Bradlo
 1st on 6 and 8 stages Tour'd Sénégal
 Win Prolog Tour'd Senegal
 Classifica Intergiro del Giro d'Italia
2008
 1st, Stage 2, Tirreno–Adriatico

After retirement
Raffaele Illiano was arrested on 30 August 2011 for his involvement in a doping scandal.

References

Italian male cyclists
1977 births
Living people
Sportspeople from Naples
Cyclists from Campania